Double Identity may refer to:

Double Identity (Killmaster novel), a 1967 spy fiction novel by Manning Lee Stokes
Double Identity (Haddix novel), a 2005 young adult novel by Margaret Peterson Haddix
Double Identity (film), originally titled Fake Identity, a 2009 film starring Val Kilmer
Double Identity (Gossip Girl), a 2010 episode of Gossip Girl